Kibergino - is a village in Russia, Ivanovo Oblast, Teykovsky District, Nerlian urban settlement.

References 

Nerl (urban-type settlement)
Suzdalsky Uyezd